During a November 1960 party celebrating his mayoral candidacy, American public intellectual Norman Mailer twice stabbed his wife Adele Morales with a pen-knife in a drunken altercation, nearly taking her life. The incident, though by many accounts swept under the rug by Mailer and his associates, had a lasting impact on his public and critical legacy and persona.

Incident 
On the night of November 19, 1960, Mailer and his wife, Adele Morales, hosted a party, intended to launch his proposed New York mayoral campaign, at the Upper West Side apartment the couple shared with their two young daughters. Mailer had enlisted his well-connected friend, journalist George Plimpton, to attract figures from the city's "power structure"; he hoped to unite at his party this elite echelon with the "disenfranchised" population he saw as his natural constituency—having written of the "courage" of hoodlums in his 1957 essay "The White Negro"—into a voting base that would propel him to office.

Though David Rockefeller and the Aga Khan declined the invitation, the party's approximately 200 guests included the poet Allen Ginsberg as well as several "derelicts, cut-throats and bohemians"—many of them homeless—whom Mailer had recruited on the street. This produced an atmosphere characterized by later commentators as, at best, "legendarily tetchy" and, at worst, "the most dangerous evening I've ever spent in my life" (from publisher Barney Rosset, a guest at the party).

Fights broke out throughout the night. By some accounts, Norman Mailer at one point divided guests "on opposite sides of the room according to whether he considered them 'for' or 'against' him". Later, almost incoherent, Mailer left the apartment to seek trouble elsewhere. Morales recalled that "he was down in the street punching people...He didn't know what his name was. He was so out of it".

When Mailer returned at 4:30 a.m. to find all the guests departed (except the "five or six" who remained in the dining room) and Morales getting ready for bed, the altercation broke out. The enraged Mailer burst into the room, and Morales taunted his heterosexual masculinity and made a disparaging reference to his mistress. Mailer rushed at her, stabbing her with a rusty two-and-a-half-inch penknife, once in the back and once through her breast, puncturing her cardiac sac and narrowly missing her heart. Mailer addressed the shocked guests standing over Morales's prostrate body: "Don't touch her. Let the bitch die". Morales was rushed downstairs to the apartment of novelist Doc Humes and then in a taxi cab to University Hospital for surgery.

Aftermath
While she remained in critical condition, Morales initially told doctors that she "had fallen on some glass", denying any wrongdoing on the part of Mailer, who had come to the hospital later that night to "lecture Adele's surgeon on the likely dimensions of her wound". Mailer appeared the next day in a scheduled interview on The Mike Wallace Show, where he spoke of the knife as a symbol of manhood and continued to plug his mayoral bid.

Two days later, in the hospital's intensive care unit, Morales admitted to police that Mailer had stabbed her; he was arrested at the hospital and involuntarily committed for 17 days to Bellevue Hospital for psychiatric evaluation by a judge, who pronounced him "both homicidal and suicidal". Mailer maintained his sanity, responding "It is very important to me not to be sent to some mental institution. I'm a sane man. If this happens, for the rest of my life, my work will be considered as the work of a man with a disordered mind".

Though Morales divorced him in 1962, she refused to press charges, citing a desire to protect their children. He was indicted by a grand jury on charges of felony assault, but after pleading guilty to a reduced charge, he received probation and later a suspended sentence.

Public and critical reaction
The reaction to the incident in the literary community to which Mailer and Morales belonged has been judged by many observers to be remarkably mild. As Mailer later noted, his friends "closed ranks" behind him. He remarked to New York Magazine in 1983 that "the reactions were subtle as hell. Five degrees less warmth than I was accustomed to. Not fifteen degrees less—five." Many of his counterparts saw the assault as an artistic, even literary act; James Baldwin, a writer and friend of Mailer, characterized it as an attempt to free himself from "the spiritual prison he had created with his fantasies of becoming a politician," "like burning down the house in order to, at last, be free of it". Diana Trilling later recalled being told by her husband, critic Lionel Trilling, that the stabbing was a "Dostoyevskian ploy" allowing Mailer to "test the limits of evil in himself."

The attack was, according to some observers, entirely consistent with Mailer's public image, founded on bombastic machismo and an existentially tinged inclination toward norm-defying violence. The incident quickly became a focal point for criticism by Mailer's feminist contemporaries, particularly feminist writer Kate Millett in her 1970 work Sexual Politics, who paralleled the attack with themes of sexual violence they found throughout his work. Nine years later, Mailer launched a second mayoral campaign, received 5% of the votes cast and enjoyed the support of prominent feminists Bella Abzug and Gloria Steinem.

Mailer long remained publicly blasé about the assault. In 1971, he made a dismissive remark during his appearance on The Dick Cavett Show, "We all know that I stabbed my wife many years ago. We all know that". Mailer's admission that the stabbing was "the one act I can look back on and regret for the rest of my life" in a 2000 interview, 40 years after the fact, marked his first public expression of remorse.

References 

1960 crimes in the United States
1960 in New York City
1960s crimes in New York City
1960s in Manhattan
Crimes in Manhattan
Domestic violence in the United States
November 1960 events in the United States
Stabbing attacks in the United States
Upper West Side
Violence in New York City